A lucky number, in number theory, is a natural number generated by a particular sieve algorithm.

Lucky number may also refer to:

Film and television
 The Lucky Number, a 1933 British comedy film
 Lucky Number (film), a 1951 Donald Duck cartoon
 Lucky Numbers, a 2000 American comedy film
 #Lucky Number, a 2015 film starring Tom Pelphrey 
 Lucky Numbers (TV series), a 1995–1997 British game show

Music
 Lucky Number (album) or the title song, by Jolin Tsai, 2001
 Lucky Numbers (album), by Frank Sinatra, 1998
 Lucky Number: The Best of Lene Lovich, an album by Lene Lovich, 2004
 "Lucky Number" (song), by Lene Lovich, 1979
 "Lucky Number", a song by Saves the Day from Saves the Day, 2013

Other uses 
 Lucky numbers of Euler, producing prime-generating polynomials
 A number believed to affect one's luck
 Lucky number combinations, an element of Chinese numerology
 Lucky Numbers, a discontinued Cadbury product